Oxidizer is the third and final studio album by Chemlab, released on January 27, 2004, by Underground Inc.

Alternate versions and controversy
Jason Novak, credited as DJ? Acucrack and a member of Acumen Nation, was responsible for the original production of Oxidizer, but according to Novak, his finished tracks were "remixed" by other producers at Louche's behest, changing the album significantly in terms of the album's sound, 'sutures' and track order by the time of its official release. Novak notes that the original version of the album "reflected the proper spirit of Chemlab", and that he did not receive proper credit on the official release, despite being responsible for the majority of the music.

Reception

AllMusic awarded the Oxidizer album three out of five possible stars. Matthew Moyer of Ink 19 praised the atmosphere and programming of the music.

Track listing

Personnel
Adapted from the Oxidizer liner notes.

Chemlab
 F.J. DeSanto – loops, noises
 Jamie Duffy – guitar, loops, production, recording
 Jared Louche – lead vocals, programming, arrangements, production
 Jason Novak – synthesizer, guitar, production, recording

Additional performers
 Dan Brill – drums (2, 9, 11)
 Russ Britton – scratching (10)
 Eliot Engelman – bass guitar (7, 9)
 Ethan Novak – drums (5)
 Geno Leonardo – sampler
 Charles Levi – bass guitar
 Dylan Thomas More – sampler (13)
 Ross Tregenza – scratching
 William Tucker – sampler (1)
 Krayge Tyler – sampler
 H. Vargas – synthesizer (10, 11)
 Mike Venezia – loops
 Ned Wahl – sampler

Production and design
 Julian Beeston – production, recording
 Bryan Black – recording
 Michael Doyle – illustrations, design
 Marc Plastic – 72 Hero
 Dave Suycott – mastering

Release history

References

External links 
 Oxidizer at Discogs (list of releases)

2004 albums
Chemlab albums
Underground, Inc. albums
Albums produced by Jared Louche